Ravni is a village located in the city of Užice, southwestern Serbia. As of 2011 census, the village has a population of 558 inhabitants.

References

Užice
Populated places in Zlatibor District